Vijayapuram is a village in Chittoor district of the Indian state of Andhra Pradesh. It is located in Vijayapuram mandal of Nagari revenue division.

References 

Mandal headquarters in Chittoor district
Villages in Chittoor district